Vukan Savićević (born 29 January 1994) is a Montenegrin footballer who plays as a midfielder for Turkish club Giresunspor.

Club career

Red Star Belgrade
Savićević became a senior-team player at age of 17. Coach Aleksandar Janković decided to promote Savićević to the senior team at the beginning of the 2012–13 season, and Savićević made his professional debut on 22 September 2012 versus Hajduk Kula. He scored his first professional goal for Red Star in a 2–1 win against FK Javor Ivanjica on 22 February 2013. On 21 June 2013, Savićević signed a new four-year contract with Red Star which lasts until 2017.

Slovan Bratislava
On 7 August 2015 Savićević pardoned Red Star Belgrade for €120,000 in unpaid salaries and signed with Slovan Bratislava.

International career
Initially, Savićević represented Montenegro on international level, having been part of the U-17 squad during 2009 and 2010. However, in 2012 he became member of the Serbian U-19 team.

He debuted for Montenegrin U21 team on 15 June 2015 in a qualifying match against Moldova, in which he scored the winning goal (Montenegro won 1-0).

Savićević was called up to the senior Montenegro squad for a friendly against Turkey in June 2016.

He did his debut for the senior national team on 4 June 2017 in a 2–1 friendly loss against Iran.

Career statistics

Honours
Red Star
Serbian SuperLiga (1): 2013–14

References

External links
 
 

1994 births
Living people
Footballers from Belgrade
Serbian people of Montenegrin descent
Association football midfielders
Serbian footballers
Serbia youth international footballers
Montenegrin footballers
Montenegro youth international footballers
Montenegro under-21 international footballers
Montenegro international footballers
Red Star Belgrade footballers
ŠK Slovan Bratislava players
Wisła Kraków players
Samsunspor footballers
Serbian SuperLiga players
Slovak Super Liga players
Ekstraklasa players
TFF First League players
Montenegrin expatriate footballers
Expatriate footballers in Poland
Montenegrin expatriate sportspeople in Poland
Expatriate footballers in Slovakia
Montenegrin expatriate sportspeople in Slovakia
Expatriate footballers in Turkey
Montenegrin expatriate sportspeople in Turkey